The Hotel Casa del Mar is a historic luxury hotel located on the beach in Santa Monica, California. It is owned and operated by the Edward Thomas Collection of Hotels (ETC Hotels).

History
The building was constructed by brothers E.A. "Jack" Harter and T.D. "Til" Harter, doing business as the H & H Holding Company, at a cost of $2 million. It opened as Club Casa del Mar, a private beach club, on May 1, 1926. Designed by Los Angeles architect Charles F. Plummer to reflect an  Italian Renaissance Revival aesthetic, the glory days of the hotel spanned 1926-41, as it became one of the most successful beach clubs in Southern California, popular with socialites and Hollywood celebrities. In 1941, the US Navy took over the building, utilizing it for enlisted soldiers during World War II. By 1960, the hotel was shuttered. In 1967, Charles E. Dederich reopened the building as the Synanon Foundation, a drug rehabilitation program. In 1978, Nathan Pritikin turned the building into the Pritikin Longevity Center, a nutrition and health care facility that closed in 1997.

The Edward Thomas Hospitality Corporation, owners of the adjacent Shutters on the Beach Hotel, acquired the property in November 1997 and spent over $50 million restoring and converting it into a luxury hotel. Architecture firms HLW International and Thomson Design Associates worked to preserve the interior and exterior of the seven-story building, reviving the hotel's original 1920s European style. It reopened as Hotel Casa del Mar in October 1999.

In February 2008, designer Darrell Schmitt completed a multimillion-dollar remodel of all 129 guest rooms and suites, adding new furniture, artwork, flat-screen televisions, windows, wallpaper, mirrors and drapes. Los Angeles magazine said the renovation had restored the hotel "to its Gatsbyesque glory."

In 2014, designer Michael S. Smith redesigned the hotel's lobby, introducing striped cabana-style sitting areas in the lobby and coast-themed artwork, among other additions. During the two-month redesign, a large, temporary street art installation was installed in the lobby. The piece of art, titled Absinthe and The Elephants, was created by local street artist Jules Muck, serving as camouflage for the lobby's central bar area during renovations.

The hotel is on the National Register of Historic Places. It was also inducted into Historic Hotels of America, an official program of the National Trust for Historic Preservation, in 2018, and, in 2022 is still a member.

Design and amenities
The hotel has 129 rooms, a curving double staircase, a high coffered ceiling, mosaic tile floors and glowing copper sconces atop mahogany pillars in the lobby. It also has a spa that offers massages, and a fitness center. The Colonnade Ballroom, with floor-to-ceiling windows facing the ocean, seats up to 270 guests. The lobby and pool look out onto the Pacific Ocean.

In June 2015, the hotel introduced a new stress management program for guests and other groups, Automatic Integrative Relaxation Response, designed by stress management expert John Sahakian. The program includes yoga, mindfulness and breathing exercises.

Dining
One of the hotel's restaurants, Catch Restaurant and Wine Bar, features a seafood menu and ocean views. In 2014, Michael S. Smith redesigned the hotel's new restaurant, Terrazza Lounge, which has a menu and style inspired by the Italian coast, with floor-to-ceiling windows overlooking the ocean.

See also
Santa Monica Army Air Forces Redistribution Center

References

External links
Official website
ETC Hotels website

Hotel buildings completed in 1926
Hotel buildings on the National Register of Historic Places in California
Buildings and structures in Santa Monica, California
Buildings and structures on the National Register of Historic Places in Los Angeles County, California
Hotels established in 1998
History of Santa Monica, California
Italian Renaissance Revival architecture in the United States
Renaissance Revival architecture in California
Tourist attractions in Santa Monica, California
Hotels in Los Angeles County, California
1926 establishments in California
Historic Hotels of America